Anuban Ratchaburi School was established on  as a mixed school for pupils aged 4 to 13. It is located in Ratchaburi Thailand.
School is government's school under the supervision of the Office of Private Education Commission (OPEC) and the Ministry of Education (MOE). The school admits boys and girls over the age of 4–13. In accordance with English Program regulations, and Native Thai Program.

Anuban in Thai can be a meaning of Kindergarten or "take care of..." as well.

Core curriculum

Class Levels
The curriculum is divided into four levels (according to the development level of students):

Core subjects
 Thai
 Mathematics
 Science
 Society, Religion, and Culture
 Health and Physical Fitness
 Careers and Technology
 English Language

External links

 Official Website (Only in Thai)
 Anuban Ratchaburi School's English program

References

Schools in Thailand
Ratchaburi province